Andrew Higginson (born 13 December 1977) is an English former professional snooker player from Widnes, Cheshire. He is best known for being the surprise finalist of the 2007 Welsh Open.

Career

Early years
After some success in amateur tournaments, Higginson turned professional for the 2000/2001 season after finishing third on the Challenge Tour. He remained there for five seasons before dropping off, after encountering limited success. He won a place back on the tour for 2006/2007 after finishing second on the Pontins' International Open Series.

Breakthrough
Higginson reached the televised stages of a ranking tournament for the first time at the 2007 Malta Cup, where he beat Steve Davis 5–4 before losing 2–5 to Ken Doherty at the last 16. At the very next tournament, the 2007 Welsh Open, Higginson hit an extraordinary run of form, defeating Marco Fu 5–2, John Higgins 5–3 (from 0–3 down), Michael Judge 5–1, Ali Carter 5–1 (making his first professional 147 break in the process) and Stephen Maguire 6–3 to reach the final. As he had spent the 2005–06 season on the secondary Challenge Tour, he was the first unranked player to reach a ranking final since Terry Griffiths won the World title in 1979. At the end of the first session of the final, he trailed 2–6 to Neil Robertson. In the second session, Higginson managed to take the lead and change the score to 8–6, but Robertson recovered to level the scores at 8–8 and force a deciding frame, which he won. Higginson earned £20,000 for his 147 break, £2000 for the highest break and £17,500 for being the runner-up.

Subsequent career
Despite his good season, Higginson failed to qualify for the 2007 World Championship, losing 9–10 to Ricky Walden in the third qualifying round. His performance in the Welsh Open and Malta Cup brought him to 44th in the 2007/2008 rankings, and 24th on the one-year list.

The following season proved tougher, with Higginson only qualifying for one event – the 2008 Welsh Open again.

However, he qualified for the 2008 Grand Prix, losing 0–5 to Mark Selby in the last 32. He then beat Jamie Jones and Michael Judge to make his Crucible debut in the 2009 World Championship, giving eventual finalist Shaun Murphy a test, leading 7–6 before losing 8–10.

2011/12
Higginson won his first professional title during the 2011–12 season at the minor-ranking Players Tour Championship Event 5, where he beat reigning world champion John Higgins 4–1 in the final. He played in all 12 of the PTC events and finished 6th on the Order of Merit, comfortably inside the top 24 who qualified for the Finals. At the Finals he beat Jamie Jones and Xiao Guodong, before losing to Stephen Lee 2–4 in the semi-finals.

He qualified for all but three of the other ranking events during the season. In the German Masters he led Ronnie O'Sullivan 4–0 in their best-of-nine frames first round match, before being defeated 5–4 having missed a pot in the sixth frame that would have left O'Sullivan requiring snookers to stay in the tournament. He finished the season by reaching the last 16 of the World Championship after defeating Stephen Lee 10–6 in the first round. There he trailed Jamie Jones 6–10 after two sessions, but rallied to level at 10–10, before Jones won three successive frames to take the match 13–10. Higginson finished the season ranked world number 18, meaning he had climbed 7 places during the year.

2012/13

Due to non-entries among the top 16 players, Higginson was automatically seeded into the venue stages of first two major ranking events of the 2012–13 season, Wuxi Classic and Australian Open, only to be beaten on both occasions by Robert Milkins and Ryan Day respectively. He was then whitewashed by Steve Davis in the qualifying for Shanghai Masters, making it three consecutive first round defeats for him. Higginson broke the streak by beating David Gilbert to reach the main draw of the International Championship, but was beaten 0–6 by Shaun Murphy in the first round at the venue in Chengdu, China. He suffered yet another whitewash in UK Championship qualifying, losing 0–6 to Liang Wenbo, and as a result fell to No. 29 in the world rankings. Higginson enjoyed more success in the minor-ranking Players Tour Championship events, reaching the semi-finals in Event One and European Tour Event Five; in the latter tournament he lost 3–4 to Anthony McGill on a respotted black, despite having been 3–1 ahead at one point and his opponent having needed two snookers in the decider. Higginson went on to finish 13th on the PTC Order of Merit to qualify for the Grand Final for the third year in a row.

Higginson's form improved in the second half of the season as he qualified for five of the six remaining ranking tournaments of the season. His best results were last 16 appearances at the German Masters and the Welsh Open: in Germany he beat Stuart Bingham 5–1 before losing by the same scoreline to Neil Robertson, and in Wales he beat Michael Wasley 4–2 before losing 1–4 to Judd Trump. At the PTC Finals Higginson was leading eventual tournament winner Ding Junhui 3–1 in the first round, before losing 3–4. His season however ended in disappointment as he was beaten 4–10 by Michael White in the final round of World Championship Qualifying, to finish it ranked world number 22.

2013/14
Higginson beat Steve Davis 5–1 in the first round of the 2013 Wuxi Classic, before losing 5–2 against Peter Lines. He was defeated in the qualifying round for the Australian Goldfields Open and, despite another win over Davis to qualify, was beaten 5–4 in the wildcard round of the Shanghai Masters by Lin Shuai. Higginson exited the Indian Open in the last 32 and the UK Championship in the last 64. Higginson won two matches in a ranking event for the only time this season at the Welsh Open with victories over Martin O'Donnell and Jimmy Robertson, before Scott Donaldson came from 3–2 down to eliminate him 4–3. Higginson had a very poor season in the eight European Tour events as his best finishes were four last 64 defeats to be placed a lowly 79th on the Order of Merit. He came within a match of qualifying for the World Championship, but lost 10–6 to Dominic Dale. Higginson fell 14 places and outside the top 32 in the rankings during they year to end it 36th in the world.

2014/15
At the Australian Goldfields Open, Higginson was defeated 5–2 by home favourite Neil Robertson in the first round. He won three games to qualify for the Shanghai Masters, but was knocked out in the opening round 5–3 by Mark Allen. A further first round exit followed in the International Championship at the hands of Joe Swail, before Higginson won his first match at the venue stage of a ranking event this season by beating Tian Pengfei 6–3 at the UK Championship. He was eliminated in the second round 6–4 by James Cahill. Higginson qualified for the China Open, but lost 5–3 to Judd Trump in the first round. He reached the final qualifying round for the World Championship thanks to wins over Scott Donaldson and Luca Brecel, and forced a deciding frame from 9–6 against Robert Milkins which he lost. The defeat meant that Higginson has failed to advance beyond the last 32 of any ranking event in over two years. His decline in the rankings continued as he ended the season 48th in the world.

2015/2016
After winning three matches to qualify for the Australian Goldfields Open, Higginson lost 5–3 to Ricky Walden in the first round and he was knocked out in the same stage of the International Championship 6–4 by Liang Wenbo. Another opening round defeat in a ranking came at the UK Championship 6–1 to David Grace. At the Gdynia Open, Higginson defeated five players to reach the semi-finals, but lost 4–2 to Mark Selby. This saw him finish 15th on the Order of Merit and qualify for the Grand Final, where he was knocked out 4–1 by Matthew Selt. Higginson failed to win a match at a ranking event for the sixth time this season when he suffered a 5–3 loss to Yuan Sijun in the wildcard round of the China Open. His ranking slump continued as he was placed 56th in the world.

2016/2017
Higginson won a first round ranking event match for the first time since the 2014 UK Championship by eliminating Mitchell Mann 4–1 at the 2016 Indian Open, but lost 4–2 against Oliver Lines in the second round. He was beaten 4–3 by Robbie Williams in the third round of the Paul Hunter Classic. Higginson qualified for the European Masters by defeating Stephen Maguire 4–3 and Ashley Hugill 4–1 and got to the last 16 of a full ranking event for the first time in over three years by whitewashing Marco Fu 4–0, but then lost 4–0 to Judd Trump. He was edged out 6–5 after being 5–2 up on Joe Perry in the opening round of the International Championship. After knocking out David Gilbert 5–3 and Ricky Walden 5–4 at the China Open, Higginson was close to making the quarter-finals as he was 4–3 ahead of world number one Mark Selby, but went on to lose 5–4.

Performance and rankings timeline

Career finals

Ranking finals: 1

Minor-ranking finals: 1 (1 title)

Non-ranking finals: 3 (1 title)

Amateur events
North West Championship (1998, 1999)
Merseyside Junior Championship (1997)
North West Pairs Championship (1996)
North West Junior Championship (1995)

References

External links

Andrew Higginson at worldsnooker.com

English snooker players
Sportspeople from Widnes
1977 births
Living people